William L. "Bill" Scholes (September 16, 1926 – October 9, 2002), was an American politician in the state of Tennessee. Scholes served in the Tennessee House of Representatives as a Democrat from the 10th District from 1967 to 1970. A native of Paris, Tennessee, he was a dentist and  veteran of the Korean War and World War II. He is an alumnus of University of Tennessee (DDS) and Memphis State University. During his time in the House of Representatives, he resided in Nashville, Tennessee.

References

1926 births
2002 deaths
People from Paris, Tennessee
Democratic Party members of the Tennessee House of Representatives